Brentinae is a subfamily of primitive weevils in the family of beetles known as Brentidae. There are at least 90 genera and 520 described species in Brentinae.

Genera
These 92 genera belong to the subfamily Brentinae:

 Abrentodes Sharp, 1895 i c g
 Acramorphocephalus Kleine, 1918 i c g
 Afrocordus Damoiseau, 1980 i c g
 Agriorrhynchus Power, 1878 i c g
 Allacompsus Kleine, 1921 i c g
 Amorphocephala Damoiseau, 1966 i c g
 Amphicordus Heller, 1913 i c g
 Ananesiotes Kleine, 1922 i c g
 Anepsiotes Kleine, 1917 i c g
 Ankleineella Zimmerman, 1994 i c g
 Anomobrenthus Fairmaire, 1881 i c g
 Apocemus Calabresi, 1921 i c g
 Arrenodes Schoenherr, 1823 i c g
 Arrhenodes b
 Baryrhynchus Lacordaire, 1865 i c g
 Belopherus Schoenherr, 1833 i c g
 Blysmia Pascoe, 1872 i c g
 Brentus Fabricius, 1787 i c g b
 Cacopsalis Sharp, 1895 i c g
 Calabresia Alonso-Zarazaga, Lyal, Bartolozzi and Sforzi, 1999 i c g
 Calorychodes Kleine, 1925 i c
 Catablysmia Kleine, 1926 i c g
 Cephalobarus Schoenherr, 1840 i c g
 Claeoderes Schoenherr, 1833 i c g
 Cobalocephalus Morimoto, 1982 i c g
 Cordus Schoenherr, 1847 i c g
 Corporaalia Kleine, 1921 i c g
 Cyriodontus Kirsch, 1868 i c g
 Damoisiella Alonso-Zarazaga, Lyal, Bartolozzi and Sforzi, 1999 i c g
 Debora Power, 1879 i c g
 Desgodinsia Senna, 1894 i c g
 Ectocemus Pascoe, 1862 i c g
 Elytracantha Kleine, 1915 i c g
 Epicoinoneus Senna, 1892 i c g
 Episphales Kirsch, 1871 i c g
 Eremoxenus Semenov-Tian-Schanskij, 1892 i c g
 Estenorhinus Lacordaire, 1865 i c g
 Eupeithes Senna, 1898 i c g
 Eupsalomorphus Kleine, 1926 i c g
 Eutrachelus Berthold, 1827 i c g
 Gyalostoma Kleine, 1914 i c g
 Hadramorphocephalus Kleine, 1918 i c g
 Haywardiales Haedo Rossi, 1965 i c g
 Hemicordus Kleine, 1922 i c g
 Hemiorychodes Kleine, 1921 i c g
 Hemipsalis Sharp, 1895 i c g
 Henarrhodes Heller, 1913 i c g
 Henorychodes Kleine, 1921 i c g
 Heteroblysmia Kleine, 1917 i c g
 Heterobrenthus Sharp, 1895 i c g b
 Heterorrhynchus Calabresi, 1921 i c g
 Holobrenthus Kleine, 1923 i c g
 Hopliterrhynchus Senna, 1892 i c g
 Hyposphales Kleine, 1927 i c g
 Kleineella Strand in Kleine, 1918 i g
 Leptamorphocephalus Kleine, 1918 i c g
 Megateras Kleine, 1921 i c g
 Mesitogenus Kleine, 1919 i c g
 Micramorphocephalus Kleine, 1918 i c g
 Myrmecobrenthus Kleine, 1920 i c g
 Orfilaia Haedo Rossi, 1955 i c g
 Orychodes Pascoe, 1862 i c g
 Paramorphocephalus Kleine, 1920 i c g
 Parorychodes Kleine, 1921 i c g
 Paussobrenthus Gestro, 1919 i c g
 Pericordus Kolbe, 1883 i c g
 Perisymmorphocerus Kleine, 1919 i c g
 Perorychodes Kleine, 1925 i c g
 Phymechus Senna, 1895 i c g
 Proepisphales Kleine, 1922 i c g
 Prophthalmus Lacordaire, 1865 i c g
 Pseudobelopherus Calabresi, 1920 i c g
 Pseudomiolispa Kleine, 1926 i c g
 Pseudorychodes Senna, 1894 i c g
 Raphirhynchidus Kleine, 1927 i c g
 Raphirhynchus Dejean, 1834 i c g
 Rhynchoneus Sharp, 1895 i c g
 Schizoeupsalis Kleine, 1917 i c g
 Schoenfeldtia Senna, 1893 i c g
 Schoenfeldtiopsis Soares and Scivittaro, 1977 i c g
 Spatherhinus Power, 1879 i c g
 Stratiorrhina Pascoe, 1872 i c g
 Stratiorrhynchus Damoiseau, 1962 i c g
 Suborychodes Kleine, 1917 i c g
 Symmorphocerus Schoenherr, 1847 i c g
 Synorychodes Kleine, 1921 i c g
 Systellus Kleine, 1917 i c g
 Teraticorhynchus Kleine, 1925 i c g
 Tmetogonus Senna, 1895 i c g
 Toxobrentus Damoiseau, 1965 i c g
 Ubaniopsis Soares, 1970 i c g
 Ubanius Senna, 1895 i c g

Data sources: i = ITIS, c = Catalogue of Life, g = GBIF, b = Bugguide.net

References

Further reading

External links

 

Brentidae
Articles created by Qbugbot